Phalangon  is a village in Ye-U Township, Sagaing Region, Myanmar.  The village is the home to the chief queen Nanmadaw Me Nu and founded by her great-grand father Bala Thaman who was posted to the Phalangon village fort during the reign of King Mahadhammaraza Dipadi of Nyaungyan dynasty to guard against the danger of Manipurs.

Gallery

References

Populated places in Sagaing Region